Ariana Kabul F.C. is the second oldest football team in Afghanistan. The club was founded in 1941.

The inaugural Afghanistan national football team was the entire squad of Ariana F.C. selected for the Afghanistan Independence football tournament, hosted in Kabul in August 1941. The team played two matches, a 3–1 loss to India and a 0–0 draw with Iran.

Club used to be the most successful football club in Afghanistan, having won the Kabul Football League in a streak from 1946 to 1955.

Achievements

Kabul Premier League
Winners (10): 1946, 1947, 1948, 1949, 1950, 1951, 1952, 1953, 1954, 1955

References

Football clubs in Afghanistan
Sport in Kabul
Association football clubs established in 1941
1941 establishments in Afghanistan